Kurt Spenrath is a Canadian award-winning filmmaker from Edmonton, Alberta. He is best known for his work on documentaries, as both a producer and director.

Career
Spenrath and his frequent collaborator Frederick Kroetsch have together created the company Open Sky Pictures which produces documentaries. Spenrath has pursued several projects about controversial professional wrestler Teddy Hart of the Hart family, he at first filmed a reality television series about Hart named Hart Attack which never ended up airing due to complications regarding Hart. Later he has attempted to film a documentary named Hart of Darkness which also ended up in limbo due to Hart's legal troubles in 2014. As of the 2018 the film is in post production. While the projects have not come to full fruition Spenrath did gain many connects in the professional wrestling industry due to his work on them, which lead him to making the documentaries The Match about the Prairie Wrestling Alliance and Hart Still Beating which is about Teddy Hart's cousin Matt.

Spenrath has also produced plays.

Personal life
Spenrath is a cat lover.

Awards and nominations

Notes

References

External links 
 

1976 births
Living people
Film directors from Edmonton
Canadian documentary film producers